The  is a pole weapon used by the samurai class and their retainers in feudal Japan.

Description and use
Although some sources place the origin of the sasumata in the Muromachi period, most sources discuss its use in the Edo period. In Edo period Japan the samurai were in charge of police operations.

The sasumata (spear fork) together with the tsukubō (push pole) and the sodegarami (sleeve entangler) comprised the torimono sandōgu (three tools/implements of arresting) used by samurai police and security forces.  Samurai police in the Edo period used the sasumata along with the sodegarami and tsukubō to restrain and arrest suspected criminals uninjured.  The head of the sasumata would be used to catch around the neck, arms, legs, or joints of a suspect and detain them until officers could close in and apprehend them (using hojōjutsu). The sasumata had a long hardwood pole usually around two meters in length with sharp barbs or spines attached to metal strips on one end of the pole to keep the person being captured from grabbing the pole. The opposite end of the sasumata pole would often have a metal cap, or ishizuki like those found on naginata and other pole weapons.

Firefighting
There were also firefighting versions of the instrument known as a chokyakusan, rinkaku, tetsubashira, or tokikama.  A similar weapon in China was known as a chang jiao qian, and sometimes called a cha gan or huo cha (fire fork), which had a similar firefighting role.  The sasumata type implements were used by firefighters to help dismantle burning buildings, raise ladders, and otherwise assist with their duties.

Modern use
Today, a modern version of the sasumata is still occasionally used by the police and as a self-defense tool.  These modern sasumata are often made of aluminum, without the sharpened blades and spikes found on their medieval counterparts. They have been marketed to schools due to a growing fear of classroom invasions, which has prompted many schools in Japan to keep sasumata available for teachers to protect themselves and students and to detain a potential threat until the authorities can arrive. The introduction of sasumata to schools came to be popular after the Osaka school massacre in 2001.

Gallery

See also
 Man catcher
 Sodegarami
 Torimono sandōgu
 Tsukubō
 Monk's spade

Citations

Sources
Cunningham, Don. Taiho-jutsu:Law and Order in the Age of the Samurai.  Boston; Rutland, Vermont; Tokyo: Tuttle Publishing, 2004.
神之田常盛. 剣術神道霞流.  萩原印刷株式会社, 2003.
Mol, Serge.  Classic Weaponry of Japan: Special Weapons and Tactics of the Martial Arts. Tokyo; New York; London: Kodansha International, 2003.

External links
 

Police weapons
Polearms of Japan
Samurai police weapons
Samurai polearms
Ritual weapons
Honorary weapons
Ceremonial weapons